Donnchadh IV, Earl of Fife [Duncan IV] (1289–1353) was sometime Guardian of Scotland, and ruled Fife until his death. He was the last of the native Scottish rulers of that province.

He was born in late 1289, the same year as his father Donnchadh III's murder. He therefore came into the Mormaerdom as a baby.  He was so young that the honour of crowning John Balliol – normally the hereditary right of the Mormaer of Fife – was delegated to a knight, namely Sir John de St. John. He also missed the crowning of Robert the Bruce, owing to his captivity in England. Robert was forced to call upon Donnchadh's sister, Isabella, to officiate in his absence.

His initial support for Robert has been doubted, but in 1315, a year after the Battle of Bannockburn, he resigned his Mormaerdom to King Robert for a regrant. The agreement with Robert ensured that the Mormaerdom would not be held by the king, and that the arms of Fife should always be unique from the similar royal arms. If Donnchadh were to die childless, King Robert would grant it to someone, by default Alan of Menteith. This was because Donnchadh's wife was in the custody of the English, and there was obviously some pressure from the men of Fife to retain their own regional ruler. He was present at the negotiations which led to the Treaty of Edinburgh-Northampton, and a signatory to the Declaration of Arbroath.

The Earl of Fife fought with the Bruce loyalists at the Battle of Dupplin Moor where, he being made prisoner, changed sides and, with William Sinclair, Bishop of Dunkeld, a great adherent of Robert the Bruce, crowned Edward Balliol King of Scots at Scone on 24 September 1332. The following year, on 19 July 1333, he fought with the Scottish army at the Battle of Halidon Hill, when he was again captured.

In 1306, Donnchadh married Mary de Monthermer, a granddaughter of Edward I of England. He died with no male heirs. He is important because he was the last male Gaelic ruler of Fife. When he died in 1353, he was succeeded in his mormaerdom by his daughter Isabella, who married four times:
 William Ramsay of Colluthie.  He succeeded as Earl of Fife, de iure uxoris. William and Isabella had a daughter named Elizabeth Ramsey. Alternatively she may have been married to William Felton.
 Walter Stewart, son Robert II of Scotland and Euphemia de Ross. He succeeded as Earl of Fife, de iure uxoris.
 Thomas Biset of Upsetlington, who succeeded as Earl of Fife, de iure uxoris.
 John Dunbar, possibly a son of Patrick V, Earl of March and his first wife Ermengarde. John Dunbar succeeded as Earl of Fife, de iure uxoris.

Isabella signed the Earldom of Fife over to Robert Stewart, 1st Duke of Albany in 1371.

Notes

Bibliography
 Bannerman, John, "MacDuff of Fife," in A. Grant & K.Stringer (eds.) Medieval Scotland: Crown, Lordship and Community, Essays Presented to G.W.S. Barrow,  (Edinburgh, 1993), pp. 20–38
 Barrow, G. W. S., Robert Bruce and the Community of the Realm of Scotland, (Edinburgh, 1988)
 Broun, Dauvit, "Anglo-French Acculturation and the Irish Element in Scottish Identity", in Brendan Smith (ed.), Britain and Ireland, 9001-300: Insular Responses to Medieval European Change, (Cambridge, 1999), pp. 135–53
 McDonald, Andrew, "Macduff family, earls of Fife (per. c.1095–1371)", Oxford Dictionary of National Biography, Oxford University Press, 2004 accessed 8 Sept 2007

1289 births
1353 deaths
Donnchad 04
Fife, Donnchadh IV, Earl of
People from Fife
People of the Wars of Scottish Independence
Signatories to the Declaration of Arbroath
13th-century mormaers
14th-century Scottish earls
Mormaers of Fife